Donald Anderson may refer to:

 Donald Clive Anderson (1897–1957), English military consultant and historian
 Donald B. Anderson (1904–1956), Justice of the Idaho Supreme Court
 Donald M. Anderson (1915–1995), American artist and designer
 Sir Don Anderson (1917–1975), Australian public servant
 Donald Anderson, Baron Anderson of Swansea (born 1939), British politician
 Donald Thomas Anderson (born 1939), English zoologist
 Donald Anderson (Metal Gear), a character from the video game Metal Gear Solid